Elizabeth II undertook a number of state and official visits over her 70-year reign (1952 to 2022), as well as trips throughout the Commonwealth, making her the most widely travelled head of state in history. She did not require a British passport for travelling overseas, as all British passports were issued in her name.

Elizabeth II was the sovereign of more than one independent state and represented both Canada and the United Kingdom on state visits, though the former on just two occasions. The relevant governor-general usually carried out state visits on the Queen's behalf.

As Queen of Canada

As Queen of the United Kingdom

See also
 List of state visits received by Elizabeth II
 List of Commonwealth visits made by Elizabeth II
List of official overseas trips made by Charles III
List of official overseas trips made by the Prince and Princess of Wales
 List of state and official visits by Canada

References

20th century-related lists
Lists of 21st-century trips
20th century in international relations
21st century in international relations
Elizabeth II
Elizabeth II
State visits
Foreign relations of Canada
Elizabeth II
Elizabeth II, state visits
Elizabeth II